Campus Diary is a Malayalam political drama film directed by debutante Jeevan Das. The script is written by Vinish Palayad.

V. S. Achuthanandan is debuting as an actor through this film, which also stars Sudev Nair, Gauthami Nair, RJ Mathukutty, Suraj Venjaramoodu.

Cast
 V. S. Achuthanandan as himself
 Sudev Nair as Nikhil
 Gauthami Nair as Krishnapriya 
 RJ Mathukutty 
 Suraj Venjaramoodu 
 Anu Sithara as Kaashi Thumba 
 Joy Mathew 
 Sunil Sukhada
 Renji Panicker 
 Kottayam Nazeer
 Mamukkoya
 S. P. Sreekumar
 Thalaivasal Vijay
 Lakshmi Priya
 Sreevidya Mullachery

Music
The music and background score for the film is composed by Bijibal, the lyrics is written by Rafeeq Ahammed.

References

External links
 

2010s Malayalam-language films
2010s political drama films
Indian political drama films
2016 films
2016 drama films